The Hong Kong Trade Development Council (HKTDC) is a statutory body established in 1966 as the international marketing dedicated to creating opportunities for Hong Kong's businesses. The organisation has fifty offices around the world, including 13 on the Chinese mainland. With more than 50 years of experience, its mission is to explore opportunities for Hong Kong companies, especially small and medium-sized enterprises (SMEs), and connect them with business partners around the world.

Governance

The HKTDC is governed by a 19-member Council of Hong Kong business leaders and senior government officials. It plans and supervises the organisation's global operations, services and promotional activities. The Council also oversees the operation of the Hong Kong Convention and Exhibition Centre.

Dr Peter K N Lam is the tenth HKTDC chairman since the Council's establishment. He started his term as chairman on 1 June 2019. On 1 October 2014, Margaret Fong succeeded Fred Lam as the Executive Director of the HKTDC. Ms Fong is responsible for the HKTDC's worldwide operations.

Lobbying 
Hong Kong Free Press revealed that HKTDC paid around HKD $84,000,000 from 2014 to 2020 to US lobbying firms, on behalf of the Hong Kong government, in an attempt to convince US politicians to object to the Hong Kong Human Rights and Democracy Act.

Trade Fairs

The HKTDC also organises more than 30 fairs each year. Nine of these fairs are the biggest of their kind in Asia, while three are the world's largest, namely, the HKTDC Hong Kong Gifts & Premium Fair, the HKTDC Hong Kong Watch & Clock Fair and the HKTDC Hong Kong Electronics Fair (Autumn Edition).

HKTDC Online Marketplace
HKTDC operates an online marketplace "hktdc.com" of 30 industries connecting more than 2 million global buyers with over 130,000 quality Hong Kong, China and Asia wholesale suppliers and manufacturers. With more than 50 years of experience in buyer-supplier matching, the hktdc.com facilitates worldwide buyers to source products and services from verified, quality suppliers and manufacturers.

Bilateral Cooperation
The HKTDC supports a series of bilateral economic and business committees. These business forums help promote economic ties between Hong Kong and the European Union, France, Japan, Korea, Taiwan, the United Kingdom and the United States. Ad-hoc meetings are also organised annually with various Chinese mainland provinces and municipalities and Taiwan.

Global Presence
The HKTDC is headquartered in Hong Kong. As of 2018, it has around 50 offices which span six continents. In addition to its headquarters its operations comprise 13 offices across mainland China as well locations throughout the Asia Pacific, including Taipei, India, Japan and Australia.

Beyond Asia, offices include: North American locations such as New York City and Toronto, plus Latin America, 11 European cities, and premises in South Africa and the Middle East.

The offices have various functions. They act as "a window for Hong Kong to the outside world", as two-way links between the relevant country or region, provide assistance for companies or individuals interested in doing business with Hong Kong, and as a liaison between the SAR Government and governments of the relevant country. Their work has had a significant effect in enhancing the international profile of Hong Kong.

See also
 Hong Kong International Wine & Spirits Fair
 Taiwan External Trade Development Council

References

External links

 HKTDC website

Foreign trade of Hong Kong
Investment in Hong Kong
Statutory bodies in Hong Kong
1966 establishments in Hong Kong
Hong Kong government departments and agencies